Rheine is a railway station located in Rheine, Germany. The station is located on the Löhne–Rheine, Emsland Railway (Rheine-Norddeich Mole) and the Münster–Rheine lines. The train services are operated by Deutsche Bahn and WestfalenBahn.

Train services

The following services currently call at Rheine:

Intercity services (IC 35) Norddeich - Emden - Münster - Düsseldorf - Cologne - Bonn - Koblenz - Mainz - Mannheim - Stuttgart
Intercity services (IC 35) Norddeich - Emden - Münster - Düsseldorf - Cologne - Bonn - Koblenz - Mainz - Mannheim - Karlsruhe - Konstanz
Intercity services (IC 77) Amsterdam - Amersfoort - Hengelo - Osnabrück - Hanover - Berlin
Regional services  Rheine - Münster - Hagen - Wuppertal - Cologne - Krefeld
Regional services  Emden - Leer - Lingen (Ems) - Rheine - Münster
Regional services  Rheine - Osnabrück - Minden - Hanover - Braunschweig
Regional services  Bad Bentheim - Rheine - Osnabrück - Herford - Bielefeld
Local services  Rheine - Münster
Local services  Rheine - Münster

Bus services
Outside the station is a bus station.

References

External links
 

Railway stations in North Rhine-Westphalia
Railway stations in Germany opened in 1890
Rheine